Gyöngyösfalu is a village in Vas county, Hungary.

Districts 
 Kispöse
 Ludad
 Nagypöse
 Seregélyháza

References

Populated places in Vas County